Ralph William Ernest Beckett, 3rd Baron Grimthorpe, TD, DL (1891–1963), was a banker and breeder of racehorses. Beckett was son of Ernest Beckett, 2nd Baron Grimthorpe. He was a partner in the Leeds firm of Beckett & Co., which later became part of the Westminster Bank, and in the aeronautical firm Airspeed Ltd. His racehorses included Fortina, which won the Cheltenham Gold Cup in 1947, and Fragrant Mac, which won the Scottish Grand National in 1952.

Personal life

Beckett was educated in 1903 at Eton College. He was educated at University College, Oxford.

Beckett gained the title of 3rd Baron Grimthorpe on 9 May 1917.

Beckett fought in World War I. He gained the rank of Lieutenant in the service of the Yorkshire Hussars in the RAF. He was Lieutenant-Colonel of the Yorkshire Hussars between 1936 and 1940. Beckett fought in World War II, where he was mentioned in despatches. He held the office of Deputy Lieutenant of the West Riding of Yorkshire. And was Parliamentary Private Secretary under secretary of state of war in 1919.

He married, firstly, Mary Alice Archdale, daughter of Colonel Mervyn Henry Archdale and Mary de Bathe, on 3 September 1914. He and Mary Alice Archdale were divorced in 1945. He married, secondly, Angela Courage, daughter of Edward Hubert Courage and Beatrice Mary Awdry, on 25 March 1945. He died on 22 February 1963 at age 71.

Beckett frequently took part in the Cresta Run, St Moritz, Switzerland.

His interest in aviation included ownership of two light aircraft. As a major investor in Airspeed Ltd, he became chairman of the company. He founded an airline, North Eastern Airways in 1935, using several aircraft produced by Airspeed, until it was grounded by World War II, He was also president of Yorkshire Aero Club.

Arms

References

Book source

Grimthorpe, 3rd Baron
1891 births
1963 deaths
Deputy Lieutenants of the West Riding of Yorkshire
British Army personnel of World War I
British Army personnel of World War II
Yorkshire Hussars officers
Ralph
People educated at Eton College
Alumni of University College, Oxford